Pamunkey Regional Library serves the counties of Goochland, Hanover, King and Queen, and King William, and the towns of Ashland and West Point in central Virginia.

Service Area 
According to the FY 2014 Institute of Museum and Library Services Data Catalog, the Library System has a service area population of 145,664 with 0 central library and 10 branch libraries. Average monthly circulation of materials is 75,000, among ten branch libraries and a bookmobile. There is no central or main branch. Administrative offices are located in the Hanover Branch. Technical Services and Mobile Services (the Bookmobile and Delivery) are located at the Atlee Branch.

History 
The library system is named after the Pamunkey River, a ninety-mile river that begins twenty miles (32 km) north of Richmond, Virginia,  where it joins the North and South Anna rivers. The Pamunkey River goes on to divide Hanover and King William counties. It joins its sister river, the Mattaponi, near West Point, where they create the York River.

The Hanover Branch of the Pamunkey Regional Library opened its doors on October 22, 1942. It was one of eleven libraries donated to rural Virginia counties by Mr. David K. E. Bruce. Mr. Bruce also donated equipment and a book collection.  The library was built to resemble 18th-century architecture. The Hanover Branch also houses a Virginiana collection that includes local history and genealogy.

The King & Queen Branch of the Pamunkey Regional Library, was housed in the former Marriott School from 1994 to 2001. It moved into a new facility next to the school.

The Pamunkey Regional Library Board of Trustees includes 10 members. Two members from Goochland, King and Queen, and King William counties and four members from Hanover county.

Branches 
 Richard S. Gillis, J./Ashland Branch Library (Ashland)
 Atlee Branch Library (Mechanicsville)
 Goochland Branch Library (Goochland)
 Hanover Branch Library (Hanover)
 King & Queen Branch Library (St. Stephen's Church)
 Mechanicsville Branch Library (Mechanicsville)
 Lois Wickham Jones/Montpelier Branch Library (Montpelier)
 Cochrane/Rockville Branch Library (Rockville)
 Upper King William Branch (King William)
 West Point Branch Library (West Point)

References

County library systems in Virginia
Education in Goochland County, Virginia
Education in Hanover County, Virginia
King and Queen County, Virginia
Education in King William County, Virginia
Public libraries in Virginia
Libraries established in 1942
1942 establishments in Virginia